Irina Khromacheva and Maryna Zanevska were the defending champions, but Khromacheva chose not to participate. Zanevska partnered Alizé Lim, but they lost in the first round to Audrey Albié and Marine Partaud.

Irina Bara and Mihaela Buzărnescu won the title after defeating Cristina Bucșa and Isabelle Wallace 6–3, 6–1 in the final.

Seeds

Draw

References
Main Draw

Engie Open de Biarritz - Doubles